Events from the year 1853 in Denmark.

Incumbents
 Monarch – Frederick VII
 Prime minister – Christian Albrecht Bluhme (until 21 April), Anders Sandøe Ørsted

Events

 15 April – The Bing & Grøndahl porcelain manufactury is founded in Copenhagen.
 20 May  Horsens State Prison is inaugurated.
 11 June – 1853 Copenhagen cholera outbreak begins and continues until October.

Undated
 Skælskør Steam Mill is constructed.

Births
 2 March – Johan Bartholdy, composer (died 1904)
 29 September – Princess Thyra of Denmark, Crown Princess of Hanover (died 1933 in Austria)
 9 December – Laurits Tuxen, painter (died 1927)

Deaths
 22 July – Christoffer Wilhelm Eckersberg, painter and professor (born 1783)
 25 August – Johan Christian Drewsen, businessman and agronomist (born 1777)
 22 December – Frederik von Scholten, naval officer and painter (born 1796)

References

 
1850s in Denmark
Denmark
Years of the 19th century in Denmark